Loimata Ahela Iupati is  a senior administrator and educator from the Pacific territory of Tokelau.

Iupati is the resident director of education of Tokelau. This is geographically a series of Pacific atolls which collectively form a territory of New Zealand.

In 1996 Iupati was part of a team appointed to translate the Bible into Tokelauan. This language is a Polynesian one, akin to Samoan and intelligible to speakers of Tuvaluan.

In 1990, Iupati was awarded the New Zealand 1990 Commemoration Medal.

References

Translators of the Bible into Polynesian languages
Tokelauan politicians
Year of birth missing (living people)
Living people
Translators from English
Translators to Tokelauan